This is a list of Indian Poets in Konkani who write in the diverse scripts used for this language.

Arun Sakhardande
B. B. Borkar
C. F. D'Costa
J. B. Moraes
J. B. Seqeira
Jess Fernandez
K. Ananth Bhat
Krishnambhat Bandkar (1876-1945)
Madhav Borcar
Dr. Manohar Rai Sardesai
Melvyn Rodrigues
Melvyn Rodrigus
Nagesh Karmali
Pandurang Bhangi
PN Sivananda Shenoy
Prakash Padgaoncar
R. V. Pandit
R.S.Bhaskar
Ramesh Veluskar
Sankar Ramani
Saratchandra Shenoi
Sudesh Lotlikar

References

Konkani-language poets